, son of regent Motohiro, was a kugyō or Japanese court noble of the Edo period (1603–1868). He held a regent position kampaku from 1707 to 1709 and from 1709 to 1712.

Family 
Parents
Father: Konoe Motohiro (近衛 基熈, 28 April 1648–13 October 1722)
Mother: Imperial Princess Tsuneko (常子内親王; 8 April 1642 – 17 September 1702), daughter of Emperor Go-Mizunoo
Consorts and issues:
Wife: Imperial Princess Ken'shi (憲子内親王; 1669–1688), second daughter of Emperor Reigen
Lady Tokukun (徳君, 1686-1721), Wife of Tokudaiji Kintake (徳大寺公全), first daughter
Konoe Iehisa (近衛 家久, June 17, 1687 – September 11, 1737), first son
Wife: Machiriji Ryōshi (町尻量子), daughter of Machiriji Kenryō (町尻兼量)
Takatsukasa Fusahiro (鷹司 房熙, 6 September  1710 – 9 June  1730), second son 
Konoe Hisako (近衛尚子, 1702 – 1720), Empress Consort of Emperor Nakamikado (中御門天皇), third daughter
Konoe Yasuko (近衛安己君, 1704 – 1725), Wife of Tokugawa Tsugutomo (徳川継友), fourth daughter
Unkwon concubine
Takara (宝演, 1714 – 1733), third son
Shin-sei (信性, 1723 – 1787), fourth son
Takatsukasa Hisasuke (鷹司 尚輔, 1726 – 19 April  1733), fifth son
Masahime (政姫, 1699 – 1704), Adopted by Tokugawa Ienobu, second daughter
Lady Fusako (房子), fifth daughter

Notes

References
 Ponsonby-Fane, Richard Arthur Brabazon. (1959). The Imperial House of Japan. Kyoto: Ponsonby Memorial Society. OCLC 194887
 

1667 births
1736 deaths
Fujiwara clan
Konoe family